Varazdat Lalayan (born 1 May 1999) is an Armenian weightlifter. He won the silver medal in the men's +109 kg event at the 2021 World Weightlifting Championships held in Tashkent, Uzbekistan. He is also a two-time medalist at the European Weightlifting Championships.

Career 

In 2018, he won the silver medal in both the men's +105 kg event at the Junior World Weightlifting Championships held in Tashkent, Uzbekistan and the junior men's +105 kg event at the European Junior & U23 Weightlifting Championships held in Zamość, Poland.

A year later, he won the gold medal in the men's +109 event at both the 2019 Junior World Weightlifting Championships held in Suva, Fiji and the 2019 European Junior & U23 Weightlifting Championships held in Bucharest, Romania.

He won the bronze medal in the men's +109 kg event at the 2021 European Weightlifting Championships held in Moscow, Russia. At the 2021 European Junior & U23 Weightlifting Championships in Rovaniemi, Finland, he won the gold medal in his event.

Achievements

References

External links 
 

Living people
1999 births
Place of birth missing (living people)
Armenian male weightlifters
European Weightlifting Championships medalists
World Weightlifting Championships medalists
21st-century Armenian people